(Anna) Kate Rew (born 11 September 1970) is an English journalist and author who founded the Outdoor Swimming Society. Rew lives in Frome, Somerset.

Early life
Rew grew up on her family's dairy farm in Devon, where she developed her love of wild swimming in the River Culm. She attended the University of Oxford.

Career
Rew is known for promoting wild swimming and nude swimming.

Rew worked as a freelance journalist, writing for The Guardian, The Times, Evening Standard, Grazia, ELLE and The Sunday Times.

Rew founded the Outdoor Swimming Society in 2006. Her book "Wild Swim" became a bestseller. She has featured in several TV and radio documentaries, including an episode of BBC Radio 4 programme Wilderness journeys, The Diving Venu and three episodes of Coast on BBC TV. The news and lifestyle periodical Monocle magazine named her as one of its 20 "heroes who deserve a bigger stage worldwide".

Books

References

External links
OSS website

1970 births
Living people
People from Frome
Alumni of the University of Oxford
English journalists
English female swimmers
Social nudity advocates
British naturists
Naturism in the United Kingdom